Elachista adianta is a moth of the family Elachistidae that is endemic to  Colorado.

The forewings are long and narrow. The costa in the basal 1/6 is dark grey. The ground colour is white, irregularly dusted with dark brown tips of scales, often forming an indistinct spot in the middle of the wing at the fold and at 2/3 of the wing. The hindwings are almost white and translucent. The underside of the forewings is grey, while the underside of the hindwings is whitish.

Etymology
The species name is derived from Greek Adiantos (meaning unwetted).

References

Moths described in 1997
Moths of North America
Endemic fauna of Colorado
adianta